Methylmalonic aciduria and homocystinuria type D protein, mitochondrial also known as MMADHC is a protein that in humans is encoded by the MMADHC gene.

Function 

This gene encodes a mitochondrial protein that is involved in an early step of vitamin B12 metabolism. Vitamin B12 (cobalamin) is essential for normal development and survival in humans.

Clinical significance 

Mutations in this gene cause methylmalonic aciduria and homocystinuria type cblD (MMADHC), a disorder of cobalamin metabolism that is characterized by decreased levels of the coenzymes adenosylcobalamin and methylcobalamin.

References

External links
  GeneReviews/NCBI/NIH/UW entry on Disorders of Intracellular Cobalamin Metabolism
 PDBe-KB provides an overview of all the structure information available in the PDB for Human Methylmalonic aciduria and homocystinuria type D protein, mitochondrial (MMADHC)

Further reading